William Thomas Jupp (11 November 1851 – 3 August 1878) was an English cricketer. Jupp was a right-handed batsman who bowled right-arm roundarm fast. He was born at Dorking, Surrey.

Jupp made two first-class appearances for Surrey in 1876, against Kent at Mote Park, Maidstone, and Gloucestershire at Clifton College. He scored 25 runs in his two matches, at an average of 12.50, with a high score of 11. He made a single first-class appearance in that same season for a United South of England Eleven against a United North of England Eleven at Argyle Street, Hull.

He died at Chertsey, Surrey, on 3 August 1878. His cousin, Harry Jupp, played Test cricket for England.

References

External links
William Jupp at ESPNcricinfo
William Jupp at CricketArchive

1851 births
1878 deaths
People from Dorking
English cricketers
Surrey cricketers
United South of England Eleven cricketers